Tokyo Overnight Average Rate (TONA rate or TONAR) or Japanese Yen Uncollateralized Overnight Call Rate is an unsecured interbank overnight interest rate and reference rate for Japanese yen. Mutan rate and TONA rate are the same things.

History
Japanese yen uncollateralized overnight call market started in July 1985.

Since December 28, 2016, the Bank of Japan has recommended the TONA rate as the preferred Japanese yen risk-free reference rate.

TONA rate is recommended as a replacement for Japanese yen LIBOR, which was phased out at the end of 2021, and Euroyen TIBOR, which will be terminated at the end of 2024.

Target rates

TONA Compounded Benchmarks 
 TONA Averages
 TONA Averages are derived from the daily compounded TONA rate. The terms are 30day, 90days, and 180 days.
 TONA Index
 Assets when 100 was invested in TONA on June 14, 2017.

References

External links 
 Daily TONA rate - Bank of Japan
 Monthly TONA rate - Bank of Japan
 TONA Averages & TONA Index - QUICK Corp

Reference rates
Interest rates